Özcan Seçmen (born 1 January 1947) is a Turkish botanist and former professor at Ayrılmıştır University. He specializes in Plant Ecology and Geography and is a member of the Turkish Biologists Association.

Published taxa 

 Helichrysum unicapitatum Şenol, Seçmen & B.Öztürk
 Lythrum anatolicum Leblebici & Seçmen
 Prangos hulusii Şenol, Yıldırım & Seçmen

Eponymous taxa
Ekimia ozcan-secmenii
Glaucium secmenii
Hypericum sechmenii

Selected publications
Seçmen, Ö. & Leblebici, E. 1978. "Gökçeada ve Bozcaada adalarının vejetasyon ve florası." II. Florası. Bitki 5(3): 271–368. Reference page. 
Leblebici, E. & Seçmen, Ö. 1995. "A new species of Lythrum (Lythraceae) from the Western Black Sea Region of Turkey." Turkish Journal of Botany 19(5): 559–560. Reference page.

References 

1947 births
Living people
Turkish botanists